Daniel James Beale (born 12 February 1993) is an Australian field hockey player. He competed in the men's hockey tournament at the 2014 Commonwealth Games where he won a gold medal.

Beale was selected in the Kookaburras Olympics squad for the Tokyo 2020 Olympics. The team reached the final for the first time since 2004 but couldn't achieve gold, beaten by Belgium in a shootout.

References

External links
 
 
 

1993 births
Living people
Commonwealth Games gold medallists for Australia
Australian male field hockey players
Field hockey players at the 2014 Commonwealth Games
Field hockey players at the 2010 Summer Youth Olympics
Field hockey players at the 2016 Summer Olympics
Field hockey players at the 2018 Commonwealth Games
Field hockey players at the 2022 Commonwealth Games
2018 Men's Hockey World Cup players
Olympic field hockey players of Australia
Commonwealth Games medallists in field hockey
Male field hockey forwards
Sportspeople from Brisbane
HC Bloemendaal players
Men's Hoofdklasse Hockey players
Youth Olympic gold medalists for Australia
Field hockey players at the 2020 Summer Olympics
Olympic silver medalists for Australia
Medalists at the 2020 Summer Olympics
Olympic medalists in field hockey
Sportsmen from Queensland
2023 Men's FIH Hockey World Cup players
Medallists at the 2014 Commonwealth Games
Medallists at the 2018 Commonwealth Games
Medallists at the 2022 Commonwealth Games